2-(2-Ethoxyethoxy)ethanol, also known under many trade names, is the organic compound with the formula CH3CH2OCH2CH2OCH2CH2OH. It is a colorless liquid.  It is a popular solvent for commercial applications. It is produced by the ethoxylation of ethanol.

Applications
It is a solvent for dyes, nitrocellulose, paints, inks, and resins. It is a component of wood stains for wood, for setting the twist and conditioning yarns and cloth, in textile printing, textile soaps, lacquers, penetration enhancer in cosmetics, drying varnishes and enamels, and brake fluids. It used to determine the saponification values of oils and as a neutral solvent for mineral oil-soap and mineral oil-sulfated oil mixtures (giving fine dispersions in water)

See also
 Cellosolve
 2-Ethoxyethanol

References

Primary alcohols
Glycol ethers